The 1968 Women's Olympic Volleyball Tournament was the 2nd edition of the event, organized by the world's governing body, the FIVB in conjunction with the IOC. It was held in Ciudad de México, Mexico from October 13 to 26, 1968.

Qualification

* Peru qualified as the 1967 World Championship fourth best team as winners Japan were already qualified as 1964 Olympic champions.

Format
The tournament was played in a single round-robin format, all teams were placed into a single pool and faced each other once.

Rosters

Venues
 Juan de la Barrera Olympic Gymnasium, Ciudad de México
 Revolution Ice Rink, Ciudad de México

Round robin

|}

|}

Final standings

Medalists

References

External links
 Final standings (1964–2000) at FIVB.org
 Official results (pgs. 772, 796–810)

O
1968
Women's volleyball in Mexico
1968 in Mexican women's sports
Vol